The James McPartland Three-Decker is a historic three-decker in Worcester, Massachusetts. Built c. 1888, it is a rare surviving instance of the form in Worcester's East Side Irish neighborhood. It has a hip roof with decorative brackets in the eaves. A square projecting section on the right side of the front facade is topped by a gable roof, and shingled porches take up the left side, that on the third floor with round-arch openings.

The house was listed on the National Register of Historic Places in 1990.

See also
National Register of Historic Places listings in northwestern Worcester, Massachusetts
National Register of Historic Places listings in Worcester County, Massachusetts

References

External links
 MACRIS Listing - James McPartland Three-Decker

Apartment buildings on the National Register of Historic Places in Massachusetts
Queen Anne architecture in Massachusetts
Houses completed in 1888
Apartment buildings in Worcester, Massachusetts
National Register of Historic Places in Worcester, Massachusetts